Finding My Way may refer to:

 Finding My Way (Rush song), a song by Rush
 Finding My Way (album),a 2012 album by Kate Todd